Fidi Toscana S.p.A. is the in-house development bank of Tuscany region, Italy. The bank allocates and distributes development funding to businesses in the region. The bank is significantly owned by Tuscany region, plus minority interests from the provinces and comunes of the region, local chambers of commerce, major and minor banks, and other public institutes (Assoturismo, Confederazione Italiana Agricoltori, Confindustria Toscana, Confartigianato Toscana, Confcommercio - Unione Regionale Toscana, Confcooperative – Unione Regionale Toscana, etc.)

The bank was registered under article 107 of Testo Unico Bancario (Italian banking law).

History
In 1998 Fidi Agricola was absorbed into Fidi Toscana.

See also

 Mediocredito Toscano

References

External links
 

Banks established in 1974
Italian companies established in 1974
Banks of Italy
Companies based in Florence
Government of Tuscany
Region-owned companies of Italy
Montepaschi Group
Development finance institutions